Degani is a surname. Notable people with the surname include:

Amos Degani (1926–2012), Israeli politician
Barbara Degani (born 1966), Italian politician
Menahem Degani (1927–2018), Israeli basketball player
Valentino Degani (1905–1974), Italian footballer

Italian-language surnames